John Barclay (January 22, 1749 – September 15, 1824) was an American soldier, politician, and jurist.  He served in the Continental Army during the American Revolution.  He served as President Judge of the Courts of Bucks County, Pennsylvania, alderman in Philadelphia and as Mayor of Philadelphia from 1791 to 1793.  He worked as president of the Bank of Pennsylvania and was one of the founders of the Insurance Company of North America.  He served as a Federalist member of the Pennsylvania State Senate for the 1st district from 1811 to 1813.

Early life
Barclay was born in Ballyshannon, Ireland on January 22, 1749. He emigrated to America just before 1779 and lived in Philadelphia, Pennsylvania.

Career
He worked as a shipping merchant and served in the Continental Army during the American Revolution. He enlisted in 1775 and was commissioned an ensign in 1776; he was eventually promoted to lieutenant and captain.  He retired from the Continental Army in 1781.

He was appointed a justice of the peace in 1782 and rose to President Judge of the Courts of Bucks County in 1789.

He was one of the fifteen aldermen selected to serve in Philadelphia under the city charter of April 1790.  He was a member of the Constitutional convention of 1790 and served as mayor of Philadelphia from 1791 to 1792.

He became president of the Bank of Pennsylvania after the Pennsylvania Assembly established its charter in 1793.

He was one of the founders of the Insurance Company of North America in 1792 and served as a director through 1793.

He was elected to the Pennsylvania State Senate for the 1st district and served from 1811 to 1813.

Personal life
He was married twice.  He married his second wife, Mary Searle at Christ Church in Philadelphia on December 11, 1781, and together they had five children.

He died in Philadelphia in 1824 and was interred in the Neshaminy Church Cemetery in Warwick Township, Pennsylvania.

Legacy
The John Barclay Elementary School in Warrington, Pennsylvania, is named for him.

References

External links

Brief biography at John Barclay Elementary School, Warrington, Pennsylvania.

1749 births
1824 deaths
18th-century American politicians
19th-century American politicians
American bankers
Continental Army officers from Pennsylvania
Continental Army staff officers
Mayors of Philadelphia
Pennsylvania Federalists
Pennsylvania state court judges
Pennsylvania state senators
People from Ballyshannon
People of colonial Pennsylvania
Burials in Pennsylvania